Phaedra may refer to:

Mythology
 Phaedra (mythology), Cretan princess, daughter of Minos and Pasiphaë, wife of Theseus

Arts and entertainment 
 Phaedra (Alexandre Cabanel), an 1880 painting

Film 
 Phaedra (film), a 1962 film by Jules Dassin based on the Phaedra myth
 Phaedra Cinema, a distributor of films in the USA of the late 20th century

Music 
 Phaedra (album) (1974), by the electronic music group Tangerine Dream
 Phaedra 2005, a later album by Tangerine Dream
 Phaedra (cantata), a cantata by Benjamin Britten based on the Phaedra myth
 Phaedra, a mysterious woman referred to in the song "Some Velvet Morning" sung by Nancy Sinatra and Lee Hazlewood
 Phaedra (opera), an opera by Hans Werner Henze based on the Phaedra myth
 Phaedra (Phèdre), a character in the opera Hippolytus and Aricia by Jean-Philippe Rameau
 Phaedra (CD label), an independent classical CD-label, publishing Belgian and especially Flemish music

Plays 
 Phaedra (Seneca), a play by Seneca the Younger
 Phèdre, play by Jean Racine

 People 
 Phaedra Parks, cast member on The Real Housewives of Atlanta Phaedra Nicolaidis, Australian actress

 Science 
 174 Phaedra, an asteroid 
 Phaedra, synonym of Bernardia, a plant genus
 Phaedra (butterfly), a butterfly genus

See also
 Phèdre'', a dramatic tragedy by Jean Racine first performed in 1677
 Fedra (disambiguation), Italian spelling of Phaedra
 Phaedrus (disambiguation)
 The 4th Colossus from Shadow of the Colossus